Belinda is an inner satellite of the planet Uranus. Belinda was discovered from the images taken by Voyager 2 on 13 January 1986 and was given the temporary designation S/1986 U 5. It is named after the heroine of Alexander Pope's The Rape of the Lock. It is also designated Uranus XIV.

Belinda belongs to the Portia group of satellites, which also includes Bianca, Cressida, Desdemona, Portia, Juliet, Cupid, Rosalind and Perdita. These satellites have similar orbits and photometric properties. Other than its orbit, radius of 45 km and geometric albedo of 0.08 virtually nothing is known about it.

The Voyager 2 images show Belinda as an elongated object with its major axis pointing towards Uranus. The moon is very elongated, with its short axis 0.5 ± 0.1 times the long axis. Its surface is grey in color.

The inner moon system is unstable over timescales of several millions of years. Belinda and Cupid will probably be the first pair of moons to collide, in 100,000 to 10 million years' time depending on the densities of the Portia-group satellites, due to resonant interactions with the much smaller Cupid.

See also 

 Moons of Uranus

References 

Explanatory notes

Citations

Sources

External links 
 Belinda Profile by NASA's Solar System Exploration
 Uranus' Known Satellites (by Scott S. Sheppard)

Moons of Uranus
19860113
Moons with a prograde orbit